The 1977 Kent State Golden Flashes football team was an American football team that represented Kent State University in the Mid-American Conference (MAC) during the 1977 NCAA Division I football season. In their third and final season under head coach Dennis Fitzgerald, the Golden Flashes compiled a 6–5 record (5–4 against MAC opponents), finished in sixth place in the MAC, and were outscored by all opponents by a combined total of 241 to 200.

The team's statistical leaders included Tom Roper with 630 rushing yards, Mike Whalen with 534 passing yards, and Kim Featsent with 549 receiving yards. Five Kent State players were selected as first-team All-MAC players: wide receiver Kim Featsent, offensive tackle Tom Jesko, linebacker Jack Lazor, placekicker Paul Marchese, and defensive lineman Mike Zele.

Dennis Fitzgerald resigned as Kent State's head coach in March 1978 to accept a position as an assistant coach at Syracuse. In three years as Kent State's head coach, he compiled an 18–16 record.

Schedule

References

Kent State
Kent State Golden Flashes football seasons
Kent State Golden Flashes football